Roger William "Rocky" Rosema (February 5, 1946 – January 15, 2020) was an American football player. A native of Grand Rapids, Michigan, he played high school football at Grand Rapids Central High School. He next played college football for the University of Michigan, principally as a defensive end and linebacker, from 1965 to 1967. He also played professional football as a linebacker for the St. Louis Cardinals from 1968 to 1971. In 2003, he was inducted into the  Grand Rapids Sports Hall of Fame. In 2011, Rosema lost a lawsuit against the NFL Players Association alleging that he was owed pension benefits.

He died of dementia on January 15, 2020, in Grand Rapids, Michigan at age 73.

References

1946 births
2020 deaths
American football linebackers
Michigan Wolverines football players
Players of American football from Grand Rapids, Michigan
St. Louis Cardinals (football) players